Rhymogona is a genus of millipedes belonging to the family Craspedosomatidae.

The species of this genus are found in Central Europe.

Species:
 Rhymogona aelleni (Schubart, 1960) 
 Rhymogona hessei (Ravoux, 1935)

References

Chordeumatida
Millipede genera